Otmoor or Ot Moor is an area of wetland and wet grassland in Oxfordshire, England, located halfway between Oxford and Bicester.

It is encircled by the "Seven Towns" of Otmoor: Beckley, Noke, Oddington, Charlton-on-Otmoor, Fencott, Murcott and Horton-cum-Studley.

Part of it is a nature reserve, RSPB Otmoor, which adjoins a Ministry of Defence firing range, which is part of a Site of Special Scientific Interest.

History
Bisected north–south by the Roman Road between Alchester and Dorchester-on-Thames, its name is derived from the Old English for "Otta's Fen".

Enclosure
Watered by the River Ray, it was until the early 19th century unenclosed marshland, and regularly flooded in winter. An Enclosure Act was passed in 1815, under which the area was extensively drained. This disadvantaged the local farmers and led to civil disturbances known as the Otmoor Riots of 1829–30.

Military range
In 1920 the Royal Air Force acquired Otmoor for use as a bombing range. Part of the moor remains in military use as a rifle range, and is also a large part of Otmoor Site of Special Scientific Interest (SSSI).

Motorway to nature reserve
The semi-wetland landscape provided habitat for many rare species of birds and butterflies. These were threatened in 1980 by a government proposal for the route of the M40 motorway to cross Otmoor. Opposition to the motorway was led by Friends of the Earth and included the "Alice's Meadow" campaign. The government eventually adopted an alternative route.

Since 1997 a large part of Otmoor has been made an RSPB nature reserve, with large areas of land being returned to marshland. Immediately east of the RSPB reserve is Otmoor SSSI.

References

Further reading

External links

'Starlings on Otmoor' video

Otmoor
Protected areas of Oxfordshire